Kelvin Marte (born November 24, 1987) is a Dominican professional baseball pitcher who is a free agent. He made his Major League Baseball (MLB) debut with the Pittsburgh Pirates in 2016.

Career
Marte played in the San Francisco Giants organization from 2007 to 2015. He signed with the Pittsburgh Pirates before the 2016 season. Marte was called up to the majors for the first time on August 30, 2016. In December 2016, Marte signed a minor league contract with the Miami Marlins. He elected free agency on November 6, 2017.

On February 5, 2018, Marte signed with the Saraperos de Saltillo of the Mexican Baseball League. He became a free agent following the season, but later re-signed with the team on April 13, 2019. Marte was released by the Saraperos on July 26, 2019.

References

External links

1987 births
Living people
Arizona League Giants players
Augusta GreenJackets players
Caribes de Anzoátegui players
Dominican Republic expatriate baseball players in Mexico
Dominican Republic expatriate baseball players in the United States
Dominican Summer League Giants players
Fresno Grizzlies players
Indianapolis Indians players

Leones del Caracas players
Leones del Escogido players
Major League Baseball pitchers
Major League Baseball players from the Dominican Republic
New Orleans Baby Cakes players
Pittsburgh Pirates players
Richmond Flying Squirrels players
Salem-Keizer Volcanoes players
San Jose Giants players
Saraperos de Saltillo players
Sportspeople from Santo Domingo
Dominican Republic expatriate baseball players in Venezuela